This is a list of people in alternative medicine who are notable for developing, founding, inventing, promoting, practicing, marketing, commentating or researching on alternative medicine.



A
 Albert Abrams – inventor of Electronic Reactions of Abrams "technology", dynomizer, oscilloclast and radioclast.
 F. Matthias Alexander – founder of the Alexander Technique, a movement retraining process.
 C. A. Ansar – Indian alternative medical practitioner
 Guillermo Arévalo Valera – Shipibo writer, vegetalista, and exponent of Amazonian traditional medicine

B
Edward Bach – Founder of flower essence therapy and the Bach flower remedies.
William Horatio Bates – Founder of the Bates Method alternative approach to eyesight improvement.
Henry G. Bieler –  American physician and author of Food is Your Best Medicine, known for diet-based healing and treatment of Hollywood celebrities.
 Ty Bollinger - Co-founder of The Truth About Cancer, promoter of ineffective cancer cures.
Paul Bragg – Known for the Bragg Health Crusades, the Bragg Healthy Lifestyle, deep breathing, water fasts, organic foods, juicing and listening to one's body.

C
Charaka – One of the founders of Ayurveda.
Deepak Chopra – Endocrinologist and Ayurvedic Medicine Practitioner, author of popular books on health and spirituality.
Nicholas Culpeper – English physician, author of the early seventeenth century Culpeper's Herbal.

E
Mary Baker Eddy – Founder of Christian Science, which advocates Christian healing.

F
Moshé Feldenkrais – Inventor of the Feldenkrais method.

G
Irene Gauthier – One of the founders of the field of Myomassology.
Sylvester Graham – Known for Graham Crackers and founded Grahamism.
Stanislav Grof – One of the founders of the field of transpersonal psychology and founder of Holotropic Breathwork.

H
Samuel Hahnemann – Founded homeopathy.
Michael Harner – Synthesized shamanic beliefs and practices from all over the world into a system now known as neoshamanism.
Gustav Hemwall – Prolotherapy injection proponent.

J
Stan Jones – Promoter of colloidal silver, which has permanently turned his skin a blue-gray color.
Adolf Just – Late 19th/Early 20th century German naturopath. Advocate for the "Nature Cure" movement.

K
John Harvey Kellogg – Promoter of colon therapy at the Battle Creek Sanatorium in Battle Creek, Michigan.
Will Keith Kellogg –  Inventor of corn flakes in 1894 and manager of the Battle Creek Sanitarium.
Sebastian Kneipp – Bavarian priest who began the Nature Cure movement (1890s).  Chiefly known for his contributions to hydrotherapy.
Louis Kuhne – Promoter of hydrotherapy, especially hip and sitz baths.

L
George Lewith – UK advocate for alternative medicine and professor at Southampton University.
Pehr Henrik Ling – Swedish pioneer of physical education. Falsely credited as the Father of Swedish Massage (that credit goes to Johann Georg Mezger).
Benedict Lust – Founder of naturopathic medicine in the United States. Purchased the rights to the term "naturopathy" from John Scheel.

M
Maria Sabina – Mexican healer, mystic leader of Mazatec people, curandero specializing in the native psilocybe mushrooms.
Caroline Myss – American medical intuitive, mystic and author.

N
Devi Nambudripad – Founder of NAET, controversial allergy treatment.

O
Leonard Orr – Developed Rebirthing.
David Orme-Johnson – Researcher and proponent of Transcendental Meditation technique.

P 
 Daniel Palmer – Founder of chiropractic.
 B. J. Palmer – Son of D.D. Palmer and known as the "developer" of chiropractic.
 Linus Pauling – Coined the term "orthomolecular medicine," the controversial use of Vitamin C and other megavitamin therapies. Pauling was however not a general supporter of alternative medicine.
 Fritz Perls – Founder of Gestalt Therapy. 
 Vincent Priessnitz – One of the founders of hydrotherapy.

R
Wilhelm Reich – Founder of Orgonomy.
Ida P. Rolf – Founder of Rolfing Structural Integration, the first bodywork that attempted to change posture.

S
Charlotte Selver – Introduced the concept of sensory awareness for movement education and healing, which influenced many health disciplines during the Human Potential Movement.
Herbert Shelton – Founded the Natural Hygiene movement.
Bernie Siegel – American MD and author who promotes cultivating one's attitude toward healing.
Rudolf Steiner – Founded anthroposophical medicine.
David Stephan - Speaker at health and wellness expos where he promotes Truehope Nutritional Support supplements.
Andrew Taylor Still – Founded osteopathy, a manual therapy practice.

T
Samuel Thomson – 19th century herbalist, founded Thomsonian Medicine.
Mabel Todd – Founded Ideokinesis, a form of somatic education, in the 1930s.
Mohammad Ali Taheri – founder of two complementary medicines Faradarmani and Psymentology.

U
Mikao Usui – Founded Reiki during the early twentieth century in Japan.

W
Andrew Weil – Founder of Integrative Medicine and author.
Darrell Wolfe – Founder of The Wolfe Clinic
J. R. Worsley – Founder of Five Elements school of acupuncture.
Frances Wright – Active in the American Popular Health Movement of the 1830s and 40s.
P. K. Warrier –  Indian Ayurvedic physician who received Padma Bhushan in 2010.

Y
Yellow Emperor (Huang Di) – Historically credited as the founder of traditional Chinese medicine.
Maharishi Mahesh Yogi – Founder of Transcendental Meditation.

References

Lists of people by association